A Lindblad resonance, named for the Swedish galactic astronomer Bertil Lindblad, is an orbital resonance in which an object's epicyclic frequency (the rate at which one periapse follows another) is a simple multiple of some forcing frequency.  Resonances of this kind tend to increase the object's orbital eccentricity and to cause its longitude of periapse to line up in phase with the forcing.  Lindblad resonances drive spiral density waves both in galaxies (where stars are subject to forcing by the spiral arms themselves) and in Saturn's rings (where ring particles are subject to forcing by Saturn's moons).

Lindblad resonances affect stars at such distances from a disc galaxy's centre where the natural frequency of the radial component of a star's orbital velocity is close to the frequency of the gravitational potential maxima encountered during its course through the spiral arms.  If a star's orbital speed around the galactic centre is greater than that of the part of the spiral arm through which it is passing, then an inner Lindblad resonance occurs—if smaller, then an outer Lindblad resonance. At an inner resonance, a star's orbital speed is increased, moving the star outwards, and decreased for an outer resonance causing inward movement.

References

Further reading
 Murray, C.D., and S.F. Dermott 1999, Solar System Dynamics (Cambridge: Cambridge University Press).

External links
 Three-Dimensional Waves Generated At Lindblad Resonances In Thermally Stratified Disks – Lubow & Ogilvie

Astrophysics
Stellar dynamics
Orbital perturbations
Orbital resonance